Luč,is a settlement in the region of Baranja, Croatia. Administratively, it is located in the Petlovac municipality within the Osijek-Baranja County. Population is 435 people.

Until the end of World War II, the majority of the Inhabitants was Danube Swabians, also called locally as Stifolder, because there Ancestors once came at the 17th century and 18th century from Fulda (district). Mostly of the former German Settlers was expelled to Allied-occupied Germany and Allied-occupied Austria in 1945-1948, about the Potsdam Agreement.

Population

Ethnic composition, 1991. census

Austria-Hungary 1910. census

References

Literature

 Book: "Narodnosni i vjerski sastav stanovništva Hrvatske, 1880–1991: po naseljima, autor: Jakov Gelo, izdavač: Državni zavod za statistiku Republike Hrvatske, 1998., ;

See also
Osijek-Baranja county
Baranja

Populated places in Osijek-Baranja County
Baranya (region)